The  is a partially agricultural, archeological culture of northern Honshu and southern Hokkaido (700–1200 CE) that has been identified as Emishi, as a Japanese-Emishi mixed culture, as the incipient modern Ainu, or with all three synonymously. Scholars frequently equate Satsumon people with Emishi, a culture that emerged in northern Honshu as early as the 5th century CE. This proposition is based on similarities between Ainu and Emishi skeletal remains as well as a number of place names across Honshu that resemble Ainu words. It is possible that the emergence of Satsumon culture in Hokkaido was triggered by immigration of Emishi people from Honshu. However, there are many differences between Emishi and Satsumon. For instance, horse riding and rice agriculture, neither of which were present in ancient Hokkaido, were both central to Emishi lifestyle. It may have arisen as a merger of the Yayoi–Kofun and the Jōmon cultures. The Satsumon culture appears to have spread from northeastern Honshu into southern Hokkaido. The Ainu culture is now generally considered to have originated from the merging of the Okhotsk culture and the Satsumon culture.

Subsistence 
Iron tools seem to have prevailed around the end of Epi-Jomon, so that stone tools disappeared in the Satsumon period. Among subsistence activities, hunting, gathering and fishing continued to be the most important. Locations of large settlements at estuaries indicate the importance of salmon. Although cultivation of buckwheat and barley is presumed for the Epi-Jomon, reliable evidence increases for the Satsumon as follows: buckwheat, rice, barley, wheat, sorghum, foxtail millet, barnyard millet, Chinese millet, green gram, perilla, melon, adzuki bean and hemp. The rice may have been imported from the mainland or, if cultivated at all, grown in dry fields. Opinions divide among those who, taking Satsumon culture as the periphery of the Kofun culture of the mainland, argue that such crops supplied a large portion of the diet, and those who think it provided only a small part and the culture was basically a continuation of the Epi-Jomon.

Society 
Even the largest Satsumon settlements show scarce evidence of social stratification. The "Hokkaido-type kofun", which have been discovered in several sites in southwestern Hokkaido, are very important in this context. They are at the end of the "Final Kofun" of northern Tōhoku, which themselves were late, extreme reductions of normal kofun of the central area which had fallen into disuse by the time of the Hokkaido type. There are various opinions about the status of those buried in Hokkaido type kofun. Some see them as immigrants from Tōhoku, others as indigenous chiefs who had a special relationship with the government of the mainland, and that such a scale of tomb could be made by normal heads of family.

References 

Archaeological cultures of East Asia
Archaeology of Japan
Ainu history